Herring–Cole Hall is a historic institutional building located at St. Lawrence University in Canton, St. Lawrence County, New York. It is a -story structure built of Potsdam sandstone.  It was built in two stages and its T-shaped plan is due to the attachment of the Cole Reading Room (1902) at a right angle to the Herring Library (1869).  It is located within the St. Lawrence University – Old Campus Historic District.

Popular campus lore maintains that the building is haunted by one or more spirits or ghosts.  The building plays host to the occasional séance for this reason, and is a favorite location for local meditation circles, though this stems from its acoustics, lighting, age, atmosphere, and isolation.

It was listed on the National Register of Historic Places in 1974.

References

University and college buildings on the National Register of Historic Places in New York (state)
School buildings completed in 1869
Buildings and structures in St. Lawrence County, New York
1869 establishments in New York (state)
National Register of Historic Places in St. Lawrence County, New York